The Sunderland Synagogue is a former synagogue building in Sunderland, England.

The synagogue, on Ryhope Road, was designed by architect Marcus Kenneth Glass, constructed by Joseph Huntley & Son, and completed in 1928. It is the last surviving synagogue to be designed by Glass. The synagogue was listed as a Grade II historic structure in 1999. The congregation ceased meeting in 2006.   The building is owned by a Jewish charitable trust which offered the building for sale or lease in 2009. Businessman George Fraser bought the synagogue in 2010. Fraser intends to convert the building into 12 luxury apartments whilst retaining the exterior but this has not yet been approved. Councillor Mel Spedding said that the planned conversion was considered to be inappropriate, and a planning application for it had not been received.  Spedding stated that he would be happy to discuss the building's future with the owner. As of May 2021 the building remained empty.

Architectural historian Sharman Kadish describes the synagogue's colorful design as a blend of Byzantine revival and  "cinematic art deco style." The exterior is an Art Deco interpretation of Byzantine style, with an oversized, arched entrance, paired arched doorways, polychrome brickwork and basket capitals.

Kadish describes the interior as "spanned by a deep barrel vault over the central aisle, which was originally painted to imitate a star-spangled sky. The gallery runs around three sides carried on slender iron columns with palmette capitals. The plasterwork Ark canopy is highly decorative, painted and gilded. It is classical in form but features decoration of Islamic and Byzantine origin, especially the cushion capitals to the columns and the chevron patterns on the shafts ..."

The synagogue replaced the original Adath Yeshurun on Moor Street in the East End, which was open from 1862 to 1928.  It became Sunderland's main place of Jewish worship once the former Sunderland Beth Hamedresh, on the corner of Mowbray Road and The Oaks West, closed in 1984.

References

External links
 Sunderland Hebrew Congregation on Jewish Communities and Records – UK (hosted by jewishgen.org).

Art Deco synagogues
Byzantine Revival synagogues
Tourist attractions in the City of Sunderland
Grade II listed buildings in Tyne and Wear
Grade II listed religious buildings and structures
Buildings and structures in the City of Sunderland
Former synagogues in England
1862 establishments in England
Sunderland